Davendra Prakash Singh (born 19 September 1965) is a Fijian middle-distance runner. He competed in the 3000 metres steeplechase at the 1988 Summer Olympics and the 1992 Summer Olympics.

References

External links

1965 births
Living people
Athletes (track and field) at the 1988 Summer Olympics
Athletes (track and field) at the 1992 Summer Olympics
Fijian male middle-distance runners
Fijian male steeplechase runners
Olympic athletes of Fiji
Place of birth missing (living people)